"Prisoner of War" is the third episode of the first season of the TNT science fiction drama Falling Skies, which originally aired June 26, 2011.
The episode was written by Fred Golan and directed by Greg Beeman.

The 2nd Mass is joined by Dr. Michael Harris, the only doctor to have discovered how to safely unharness enslaved children. A failed attempt to reclaim Tom's son Ben leaves Hal and his girlfriend Karen at the mercy of the aliens. A Skitter later orders a Mech to kill the remaining kids in front of Hal, then releases Hal to deliver a message: take one, the rest die.

Plot 
Tom, Hal, Karen, Anthony, Dai and Margaret watch as kids with harnesses collect scrap metal for the aliens. Tom sees his son, Ben and the group prepare to grab him. Karen accidentally knocks a loose piece of rock from the building, alerting the aliens and the group runs away.

Back at the school, parents of harnessed kids come over and ask Tom if he saw anything. Mike tells them to back off as more and more badger Tom for the information.  Col. Porter tells Tom that a doctor has a theory on how to remove the harnesses and that he wants to test it on Ben. Porter then tells him to bring Ben back safely. Tom meets up with Matt who heard that when a harness is removed, the kids die. Tom reassures his son that Ben will be fine.

Col. Porter calls a briefing for the fighters in a classroom.  Long-distance communication collapsed when the Skitters detonated their EMP attack at the start of the invasion six months ago, leaving the resistance to have to rely on sending scouts to physically run west to try to find out more information, and the runners have finally returned.  Porter reports that they contacted another human resistance militia in the outskirts of Chicago, who in turn told them that they had contacted other resistance cells in Oklahoma and Texas, with fuzzy reports of surviving human resistance cells as far away as California.  The Massachusetts resistance cell is no longer alone, and they are going to begin coordinating a nationwide guerrilla war against the aliens.  Col. Porter says this means they have to start thinking tactically, gathering reconnaissance on Skitter tactics, technology, and troop deployments.

In his cell, Pope is given food but finds it disgusting. Here he tells Uncle Scott that he was a chef before the invasion.  At first Scott is incredulous at this, but Pope explains that when he was in prison he worked the kitchen detail, and took cooking correspondence classes on the side to get certified (as if the other prisoners thought the food was bad, they would have knifed him).  Uncle Scott tells Weaver about this and he interviews Pope about the possibility of letting him cook for everyone. Tom finds Anne and Lourdes, and Anne tells Tom about Dr. Harris. Tom knows Harris and the two of them discuss Ben and Tom's late wife, Rebecca.

Tom, Hal, Karen, Dai and Mike go to find Ben. Tom and Mike hide behind rubble. Mike sees his son and runs toward him, despite the danger of the Mechs and Skitters. Mike grabs his son and Tom destroys a Mech. Another Mech, however, blows up a car, which knocks Tom out. Dai grabs him and takes him in their vehicle, leaving Hal and Karen behind. Later, in a dark alley, Tom wakes up with Dai, Mike and his son. Dai tells Tom that Hal and Karen were left behind. Tom goes to find them and is attacked by a Skitter, but Tom shoots two of its legs off with a shotgun and beats it half-to-death. Tom returns to the school with the Skitter and deems it a "Prisoner of War".

Later that night, an injured Hal wakes up from on the ground where the Mech attacked. Harnessed kids (including Ben) come and drag an unconscious Karen away with them. Hal is delusional and weak and fails to stop them. A Mech and Skitter gather a group of kids and the Mech executes them right in front of Hal.

Back at the school, Dr. Harris successfully removes the harness from Mike's son, with the help of Anne, Dai and Lourdes.  Harris explains that he figured out why children always died in previous attempts to remove the harnesses:  they synthesize some sort of drug into the body, stimulating the brain's nerve receptors in some way that facilitates mind-control.  Whatever this drug is, suddenly being separated from it made children die of shock.  Harris theorized that while they didn't know exactly what the drug was, it must have vaguely similar effects as other drugs that stimulate the cognitive centers of the brain, such as morphine.  Injecting a child with a large dose of morphine before removing the harness would serve as a "bridge" to safely transition off of the alien drug without fatally shocking the brain, after which the child could be incrementally weaned off the morphine.  Using this procedure, Harris and Anne are able to successfully cut the harness off Mike's son without killing him.  However, Harris says that it is impossible to remove the tips of the needles that have fused into the child's spine:  the points of the needles seem to be some sort of nanotechnology that grows into the spine the longer it is present.

Tom finds Hal alive and Hal tells his father of what he witnessed. Tom explains that the Nazis used similar tactics against Allied POW's in World War II:  if one prisoner managed to escape, they would execute entire groups but leave one witness behind, to let the Allies know the harsh reprisal they would exact.  The Skitters let Hal escape because they want to discourage the human resistance from attempting to free more harnessed children.

Tom returns to the school and finds Anne. He reveals that Hal blames himself for Karen's abduction and is not taking it well. Tom asks Anne where he can find Dr. Harris. Harris drinks, watching the captured Skitter. Tom confronts him about his deceased wife. It is revealed that Harris abandoned Tom's wife and left her to die when the attacks began. Tom punches Harris in the face in anger.

In the closing scene, Mike's son lays down on a stretcher and the scene cuts to the captured Skitter, which opens its eyes, it cuts back to Mike's son, who opens his eyes too.

Production

Development 
The episode was written by Fred Golan and directed by Greg Beeman. Beeman previously directed the second episode, The Armory. He later goes on to direct the season finale, Eight Hours.

Beeman stated in his director's blog that executive producer Graham Yost was overseeing the script at the point the episode hit production. Yost wanted to open the episode with a scene on a rooftop, as did Beeman. The Director of Photography, Chris Faloona and Beeman's production designer, Rob Gray "all wanted to go on the roof". They agreed the visual scope was a much better way to open the episode. They went onto the roof and designed every shot a shooting sequence that would be most efficient.

For the fight in the tunnel, Beeman said "The writer's came up with a concept that our heroes travel through abandoned sewer tunnels to travel between the school and the main part of the city."
They found an old abandoned glass factory. "It was an above-ground tunnel - but when blacked in and lit correctly it looked perfect." Since he was directing both episodes, Beeman "shot the tunnel scenes for both episodes at the same time." (In the second episode, Pope takes Tom and his team hostage through a tunnel). For the actual Skitter attack, the alien took 5 puppeteers to work it. The main one was a man who was in the suit. Two were working radio controls to operate its facial expressions and two more were needed to puppetteer its legs.

Reception

Ratings 
In its original American broadcast, "Prisoner of War" was seen by an estimated 4.20 million household viewers, according to Nielsen Media Research. It marked a significant drop in viewership compared to the previous week's double episode, series premiere "Live and Learn" and "The Armory", which were both seen by 5.91 million household viewers. "Prisoner of War" received a 1.5 rating among viewers between ages 18 and 49.

Reviews 

Ryan McGee of The A.V. Club awarded the episode with a B grade, stating: "Falling Skies premiered last week with a two-hour block that wasn’t so much an extended pilot but two episodes that  on the same night. That’s not necessarily a bad thing: While the first hour hummed along at a decent but semi-predictable pace, the second hour featured a fascinating detour into a high school that was more chamber drama than alien invasion. “Prisoner of War” returns to the format of the first hour, with an established theme depicted in the show’s title and a singular mission played out on multiple fronts. If anything stood out in this latest hour, it’s how shamelessly this show wears its narrative antecedents on its sleeve."

Alan Sepinwall of HitFix said of the episode: "...there were some discussion-worthy things in "Prisoner of War," and I'm also curious to see ongoing reaction to the show..." He stated that he enjoyed the scene where the Skitter attacks Tom, stating, "Noah Wyle takes out a skitter singlehanded! Tom dragging the creature through the school was a nice moment (if, like most of the series, borrowed from another alien invasion story, in this case Will Smith in the desert in "Independence Day"), and I remain impressed by the effects work on the creature itself.

Matt Richenthal from TV Fanatic stated: "Falling Skies delivered my favorite hour of the opening three via "Prisoner of War." Not only did it shed new light on Tom - his overwhelming guilt at accidentally abandoning Hal made even more sense when we learned how his wife died - but it gave us plenty of insight into those invading Skitters."

References 

2011 American television episodes
Falling Skies (season 1) episodes
Television episodes about prisoners of war
Television episodes about child abduction